Kurt Nogan (born 9 September 1970) is a Welsh footballer. He is normally a centre forward but has been used as an attacking right midfielder, and is the younger brother of fellow footballer Lee Nogan. He had a long career with a number of Football League clubs (playing over 300 games), including Luton Town, Brighton and Hove Albion, Burnley, Preston North End and Cardiff City.

Career
Born in Cardiff, Wales, he arrived at Burnley in February 1995 where he made 108 appearances scoring 42 goals. He made his debut for Preston North End in March 1997 and went on to make 106 appearances, scoring 31 goals before moving on to his home town club Cardiff City, where his only goal was a dramatic late winner against Hartlepool United. He was forced to retire from the professional game in 2001 because of injury. The highlight of Nogan's career was scoring two goals to put Preston North End 2–0 up in an FA Cup tie with holders Arsenal. However, Arsenal came back to win the game 4–2.

In December 2007 he played with Welsh Football League side ENTO Aberaman Athletic. He also took part in Cardiff City's campaign in the 2008 Screwfix Western Masters competition.

Honours
Individual
PFA Team of the Year: 1995–96 Second Division

References

External links

1970 births
Living people
Footballers from Cardiff
Welsh footballers
Wales under-21 international footballers
Association football forwards
Luton Town F.C. players
Peterborough United F.C. players
Brighton & Hove Albion F.C. players
Burnley F.C. players
Preston North End F.C. players
Cardiff City F.C. players
Tiverton Town F.C. players
Aberaman Athletic F.C. players
English Football League players